The Bloke Plateau is an extensive bowl-like plateau in southwest Slovenia, part of the traditional region of Inner Carniola.

Geography
Together with the Rakitna tectonic block, the plateau is delineated by two distinct Dinaric faults. According to the geographer Anton Melik, the Bloke Plateau is a remnant of a Pliocene peneplain in the middle of the rejuvenated terrain. Poorly permeable karst limestone and Triassic dolomite (in the northern part of the plateau) conditioned the formation of typical surface watercourses (Bloščica Creek and Blatnica Creek), which are bounded by wet grasslands and minerotrophic fens. Lake Bloke, a reservoir, lies near the settlement of Volčje. Water flows below ground from the Bloke Plateau into Lake Cerknica. The plateau's many hills divide it into the Bloščica Valley and Ločica Valley (or Farovščica Valley), which join to form the Bloke–Fara Karst Field. There are 45 settlements on the plateau, administratively belonging to the Municipality of Bloke.

The Bloke Plateau is accessible from several directions, especially from the Ljubljana and Littoral directions via the A1 Freeway and the town of Unec via Cerknica and from Lower Carniola via Ribnica and Sodražica. Points of interest in the area include Cross Cave, Lake Cerknica, Snežnik Castle, and Rak Škocjan Park (a protected landscape area). Geographically, the Bloke Plateau also extends to Snežnik Regional Park.

History
The Bloke Plateau was first mentioned in written documents in 1260, and its central settlement of Nova Vas in 1341. The territory was settled in the first millennium BC by the Iapydes (an Illyrian tribe). During the Roman era, a road led across the Bloke Plateau from Aquileia and the Kvarner Gulf toward the Pannonian Basin. Remains of a defense wall and a Roman tower near the village of Benete testify to this history.

Cultural heritage
Culturally, the Bloke Plateau is known as the place where skiing originated in Slovenia, and a cross-country skiing competition is held there every year. The Bloke Plateau has long been crisscrossed by trade routes connecting the interior of Carniola, especially Lower Carniola and Inner Carniola, with Croatia.

References

External links
Bloke Plateau on Geopedia

Karst plateaus of Slovenia
Karst fields
Plateaus of Inner Carniola
Municipality of Bloke